Media RSS (MRSS) is an RSS extension that adds several enhancements to RSS enclosures, and is used for syndicating multimedia files (audio, video, image) in RSS feeds. It was originally designed by Yahoo! and the Media RSS community in 2004, but in 2009 its development has been moved to the RSS Advisory Board. One example of enhancements is specification of thumbnails for each media enclosure, and the possibility to enclose multiple versions of the same content (e.g. different file formats).

The format can be used for podcasting, which uses the RSS format as a means of delivering content to media-playing devices, as well as Smart TVs. Media RSS allows for a much more detailed description of the content to be delivered to the subscriber than the RSS standard. The standard is also used by content publishers to feed media files into Yahoo! Video Search, which is a feature of Yahoo! Search that allows users to search for video files.

Applications supporting MRSS

 Adobe Media Player
 Amazon Fire TV
 Cooliris
 Dailymotion
 Dokuwiki
 QuiteRSS
 Roku

Services supporting MRSS

Cooliris
The Filter
Phanfare
DeviantArt
JW Player
PeerTube

References

External links
 Media RSS Specification
 RSS Media: Discussion of metadata extensions to RSS for describing media enclosures, 
 FEED Validator: Media RSS validation 

RSS